Minacraga is a genus of moths of the family Dalceridae.

Species
Minacraga disconitens group:
 Minacraga disconitens Schaus, 1905
 Minacraga plata S.E. Miller, 1994
 Minacraga similis S.E. Miller, 1994
 Minacraga indiscata Dyar, 1910
 Minacraga argentata Hopp, 1922
 Minacraga itatiaia S.E. Miller, 1994
Minacraga aenea group:
 Minacraga aenea Hopp, 1921
 Minacraga hyalina S.E. Miller, 1994

References

Dalceridae
Zygaenoidea genera